The Responsibility to Protect (R2P or RtoP) is a global political commitment which was endorsed by all member states of the United Nations at the 2005 World Summit in order to address its four key concerns to prevent genocide, war crimes, ethnic cleansing and crimes against humanity. The doctrine is regarded as a unanimous and well established international norm over the past two decades.

The principle of the Responsibility to Protect is based upon the underlying premise that sovereignty entails a responsibility to protect all populations from mass atrocity crimes and human rights violations. The principle is based on a respect for the norms and principles of international law, especially the underlying principles of law relating to sovereignty, peace and security, human rights, and armed conflict. The R2P has three pillars: 
Pillar I: The protection responsibilities of the state – "Each individual state has the responsibility to protect its population from genocide, war crimes, ethnic cleansing, and crimes against humanity"
 Pillar II: International assistance and capacity-building – States pledge to assist each other in their protection responsibilities
 Pillar III: Timely and decisive collective response – If any state is "manifestly failing" in its protection responsibilities, then states should take collective action to protect the population.
While there is agreement among states about the Responsibility to Protect, there is persistent contestation about the applicability of the third pillar in practice. The Responsibility to Protect provides a framework for employing measures that already exist (i.e., mediation, early warning mechanisms, economic sanctions, and chapter VII powers) to prevent atrocity crimes and to protect civilians from their occurrence. The authority to employ the use of force under the framework of the Responsibility to Protect rests solely with United Nations Security Council and is considered a measure of last resort. The United Nations Secretary-General has published annual reports on the Responsibility to Protect since 2009 that expand on the measures available to governments, intergovernmental organizations, and civil society, as well as the private sector, to prevent atrocity crimes.

The Responsibility to Protect has been the subject of considerable debate, particularly regarding the implementation of the principle by various actors in the context of country-specific situations, such as Libya, Syria, Sudan, Kenya and Ukraine, for example.

Definition 
The Responsibility to Protect is a unanimously adopted by all members of the United Nations General Assembly at the 2005 World Summit and articulated in paragraphs 138–139 of the 2005 World Summit Outcome Document: 138. Each individual State has the responsibility to protect its populations from genocide, war crimes, ethnic cleansing and crimes against humanity. This responsibility entails the prevention of such crimes, including their incitement, through appropriate and necessary means. We accept that responsibility and will act in accordance with it. The international community should, as appropriate, encourage and help States to exercise this responsibility and support the United Nations in establishing an early warning capability. 139. The international community, through the United Nations, also has the responsibility to use appropriate diplomatic, humanitarian and other peaceful means, in accordance with Chapters VI and VIII of the Charter, to help protect populations from genocide, war crimes, ethnic cleansing and crimes against humanity. In this context, we are prepared to take collective action, in a timely and decisive manner, through the Security Council, in accordance with the Charter, including Chapter VII, on a case-by-case basis and in cooperation with relevant regional organizations as appropriate, should peaceful means be inadequate and national authorities manifestly fail to protect their populations from genocide, war crimes, ethnic cleansing and crimes against humanity. We stress the need for the General Assembly to continue consideration of the responsibility to protect populations from genocide, war crimes, ethnic cleansing and crimes against humanity and its implications, bearing in mind the principles of the Charter and international law. We also intend to commit ourselves, as necessary and appropriate, to helping States build capacity to protect their populations from genocide, war crimes, ethnic cleansing and crimes against humanity and to assisting those which are under stress before crises and conflicts break out.140. We fully support the mission of the Special Advisor of the Secretary-General on the Prevention of Genocide.

The above paragraphs in the 2005 World Summit Outcome Document serve as the basis for the inter-governmental agreement to the Responsibility to Protect. The General Assembly adopted the 2005 World Summit Outcome Document in its resolution 60/1 of 2005. The body subsequently committed to continue consideration of the Responsibility to Protect with its Resolution A/Res/63/308 of October 2009. The UN Security Council first reaffirmed the Responsibility to Protect in Resolution 1674 (2006) on the protection of civilians in armed conflict, recalling in particular paragraphs 138 and 139 of the Summit Outcome regarding the responsibility to protect populations from genocide, war crimes, ethnic cleansing and crimes against humanity.

Scope and limitations of the Responsibility to Protect 
The report of the International Commission on Intervention and State Sovereignty, which first articulated the Responsibility to Protect in its December 2001 Report, envisioned a wide scope of application in its articulation of the principle. This included "overwhelming natural or environmental catastrophes, where the state concerned is either unwilling or unable to cope, or call for assistance, and significant loss of life is occurring or threatened."

Heads of State and Government at the 2005 World Summit refined the scope of the Responsibility to Protect to the four crimes mentioned in paragraphs 138 and 139, namely genocide, war crimes, ethnic cleansing and crimes against humanity, which are commonly referred to as 'atrocity crimes' or 'mass atrocity crimes'.

As per the Secretary-General's 2009 Report on the Responsibility to Protect, Implementing the Responsibility to Protect, "The responsibility to protect applies, until Member States decide otherwise, only to the four specified crimes and violations: genocide, war crimes, ethnic cleansing and crimes against humanity...To try to extend it to cover other calamities, such as HIV/AIDS, climate change or the response to natural disasters, would undermine the 2005 consensus and stretch the concept beyond recognition or operational utility."

The focused scope is part of what the UN Secretary-General has termed a "narrow but deep approach" to the Responsibility to Protect: A narrow application to four crimes, but a deep approach to response, employing the wide array of prevention and protection instruments available to Member States, the United Nations system, regional and subregional organizations and civil society.

Three Pillars of the Responsibility to Protect 
The Responsibility to Protect consists of three important and mutually-reinforcing pillars, as articulated in the 2009 Report of the Secretary-General on the issue, and which build off paragraphs 138 and 139 of the 2005 World Summit Outcome Document and the intergovernmental agreement to the principle:
 Pillar I: The protection responsibilities of the state – "Each individual state has the responsibility to protect its population from genocide, war crimes, ethnic cleansing, and crimes against humanity"
 Pillar II: International assistance and capacity-building – States pledge to assist each other in their protection responsibilities
 Pillar III: Timely and decisive collective response – If any state is "manifestly failing" in its protection responsibilities, then states should take collective action to protect the population.
While there is widespread agreement among states about the Responsibility to Protect (only Cuba, Nicaragua, Venezuela and Sudan have questioned R2P's validity), there is persistent contestation about the applicability of the third pillar in practice.

According to the UN Secretary-General's 2012 report, the three pillars of the Responsibility to Protect are not sequential and are of equal importance. "Without all three, the concept would be incomplete. All three pillars must be implemented in a manner fully consistent with the purposes, principles, and provisions of the Charter." The pillared approach is intended to reinforce, not undermine state sovereignty. As per the 2009 report of the Secretary-General, "By helping States to meet their core protection responsibilities, the responsibility to protect seeks to strengthen sovereignty, not weaken it. It seeks to help States to succeed, not just to react when they fail."

The Responsibility to Protect and Humanitarian Intervention 
The Responsibility to Protect differs from humanitarian intervention in four important ways. First, humanitarian intervention only refers to the use of military force, whereas R2P is first and foremost a preventive principle that emphasizes a range of measures to stem the risk of genocide, war crimes, ethnic cleansing or crimes against humanity before the crimes are threatened or occur. The use of force may only be carried out as a measure of last resort, when all other non-coercive measures have failed, and only when it is authorized by the UN Security Council. This is in contrast to the principle of 'humanitarian intervention', which claims to allow for the use of force as a humanitarian imperative without the authorization of the Security Council.

The second point relates to the first. As a principle, the Responsibility to Protect is rooted firmly in existing international law, especially the law relating to sovereignty, peace and security, human rights, and armed conflict.

Third, while humanitarian interventions have in the past been justified in the context of varying situations, R2P focuses only on the four mass atrocity crimes: genocide, war crimes, crimes against humanity and ethnic cleansing. The first three crimes are clearly defined in international law and codified in the Rome Statute of the International Criminal Court, the treaty which established the International Criminal Court. Ethnic cleansing is not a crime defined under international law, but has been defined by the UN as "a purposeful policy designed by one ethnic or religious group to remove by violent and terror-inspiring means the civilian population of another ethnic or religious group from certain geographic areas".

Finally, while humanitarian intervention assumes a "right to intervene", the R2P is based on a "responsibility to protect". Humanitarian intervention and the R2P both agree on the fact that sovereignty is not absolute. However, the R2P doctrine shifts away from state-centered motivations to the interests of victims by focusing not on the right of states to intervene but on a responsibility to protect populations at risk. In addition, it introduces a new way of looking at the essence of sovereignty, moving away from issues of "control" and emphasising "responsibility" to one's own citizens and the wider international community.

History

1990s: Origins 
The norm of the R2P was born out of the international community's failure to respond to tragedies such as the Rwandan genocide in 1994 and the Srebrenica genocide in 1995. Kofi Annan, who was Assistant Secretary-General at the UN Department for Peacekeeping Operations during the Rwandan genocide, realized the international community's failure to respond. In the wake of the Kosovo intervention, 1999, Annan insisted that traditional notions of sovereignty had been redefined: "States are now widely understood to be instruments at the service of their peoples", he said, while U.S. President Bill Clinton cited human rights concerns in 46% of the hundreds of remarks that he made justifying intervention in Kosovo.
In 2000, and in his capacity as UN Secretary-General, Annan wrote the report "We the Peoples" on the role of the United Nations in the 21st Century, and in this report he posed the following question: "if humanitarian intervention is, indeed, an unacceptable assault on sovereignty, how should we respond to a Rwanda, to a Srebrenica – to gross and systematic violations of human rights that offend every precept of our common humanity?"

2000: African Union proposes a right to intervene 
The African Union (AU) claimed a responsibility to intervene in crisis situations if a state is failing to protect its population from mass atrocity crimes. In 2000, the AU incorporated the right to intervene in a member state, as enshrined in Article 4(h) of its Constitutive Act, which declares "[t]he right of the Union to intervene in a Member State pursuant to a decision of the Assembly in respect of grave circumstances, namely war crimes, genocide and crimes against humanity". The AU also adopted the Ezulwini Consensus in 2005, which welcomed R2P as a tool for the prevention of mass atrocities.

2000: International Commission on Intervention and State Sovereignty 
In September 2000, following an appeal by its Foreign Minister Lloyd Axworthy, the Canadian government established the International Commission on Intervention and State Sovereignty (ICISS) to answer Annan's question "if humanitarian intervention is, indeed, an unacceptable assault on sovereignty, how should we respond to a Rwanda, to a Srebrenica – to gross and systematic violations of human rights that affect every precept of our common humanity?" In February 2001, at the third round table meeting of the ICISS in London, Gareth Evans, Mohamed Sahnoun, and Michael Ignatieff suggested the phrase "responsibility to protect" as a way to avoid the "right to intervene" or "obligation to intervene" doctrines and yet keep a degree of duty to act to resolve humanitarian crises.

In 2001, ICISS released a report titled "The Responsibility to Protect" . In a radical reformulation of the meaning of state sovereignty, the report argued that sovereignty entailed not only rights but also responsibilities, specifically a state's responsibility to protect its people from major violations of human rights. This idea rested on earlier work by Francis Deng and Roberta Cohen regarding internally displaced persons. Inspiration may also be attributed to Jan Eliasson, who in response to a questionnaire on internally displaced persons distributed by Francis Deng, stated that assisting populations at risk within their own country was "basically a question of striking a balance between sovereignty and solidarity with people in need." The ICISS report further asserted that, where a state was "unable or unwilling" to protect its people, the responsibility should shift to the international community and "the principle of non-intervention yields to the international responsibility to protect." The ICISS argued that any form of military intervention is "an exceptional and extraordinary measure", and, as such, to be justified it must meet certain criteria, including:

 Just cause: There must be "serious and irreparable harm occurring to human beings, or imminently likely to occur".
 Right intention: The main intention of the military action must be to prevent human suffering.
 Last resort: Every other measure besides military invention has to have already been taken into account. (This does not mean that every measure has to have been tried and been shown to fail, but that there are reasonable grounds to believe that only military action would work in that situation.)
 Proportional means: The military means must not exceed what is necessary "to secure the defined human protection objective".
 Reasonable prospects: The chance of success must be reasonably high, and it must be unlikely that the consequences of the military intervention would be worse than the consequences without the intervention.
 Right authority: The military action has to have been authorized by the Security Council.

2005 World Summit Outcome Document 
As the ICISS report was released in 2001, right around the time of the Second Gulf War, many thought that would be the end of this new norm. However, at the 2005 World Summit, where the largest number of heads of state and government in the history of the UN convened, the R2P was unanimously adopted. While the outcome was close to the ideas of the ICISS report, there were some notable differences: the R2P would now only apply to mass atrocity crimes (genocide, war crimes, crimes against humanity and ethnic cleansing), rather than human rights violations; no mention was made of the criteria of intervention (see above); and the UN Security Council was made the only body allowed to authorize intervention. The paragraphs also stress the importance of regional organizations and the role they can play through Chapter VIII of the UN Charter.

The results of this summit led to world leaders agreeing on holding each other accountable if they fail to uphold the new responsibilities. Decidedly if one state fails to uphold their responsibility this is now where State Sovereignty may be broken in order to protect people in danger of such crimes. First peaceful action is to be taken through humanitarian, diplomatic, or other means. If these fail to resolve the matter, the international community should come together in a “timely and decisive manner”. This shall all be worked on a case-by-case basis through the UN Security Council as well as the UN Charter.

Secretary-General's 2009 report 
On 12 January 2009, UN Secretary-General Ban Ki-moon issued a report entitled Implementing the Responsibility to Protect . The report was the first comprehensive document from the UN Secretariat on the R2P, following Ban's stated commitment to turn the concept into policy. The Secretary-General's report set the tone and the direction for the discussion on the subject at the UN. The report proposes three-pillar approach to the R2P:

 Pillar One stresses that states have the primary responsibility to protect their populations from genocide, war crimes, ethnic cleansing, and crimes against humanity.
 Pillar Two addresses the international community's commitment to help states build capacity to protect their populations from genocide, war crimes, ethnic cleansing, and crimes against humanity, and to help those under stress before crises and conflicts break out.
 Pillar Three focuses on the responsibility of international community to act in a timely and decisive way to prevent and halt genocide, ethnic cleansing, war crimes, and crimes against humanity when a state manifestly fails to protect its populations.

Global Centre for the Responsibility to Protect 
The Global Centre for the Responsibility to Protect (GCR2P) is an international non-governmental organization that conducts research and advocacy for the Responsibility to protect. The Centre is based at the Graduate Center, CUNY, New York City with an office also located in Geneva.

United Nations 
At the 2005 World Summit, UN member states included R2P in the Outcome Document agreeing to Paragraphs 138 and 139 as written in its Definition. These paragraphs gave final language to the scope of R2P. It applies to the four mass atrocities crimes only. It also identifies to whom the R2P protocol applies; i.e., nations first, and regional and international communities second. Since then, the UN has been actively engaged with the development of the R2P. Several resolutions, reports, and debates have emerged through the UN forum.

Security Council 
The Security Council has reaffirmed its commitment to the R2P in more than 80 resolutions. The first such resolution came in April 2006, when the Security Council reaffirmed the provisions of paragraphs 138 and 139 in Resolution 1674, formalizing their support for the R2P. In 2009, the Council again recognized states' primary responsibility to protect and reaffirmed paragraphs 138 and 139 in resolution 1894.

Additionally, the Security Council has mentioned the R2P in several country-specific resolutions:
 Darfur: Resolution 1706 in 2006
 Libya: Resolution 1970, Resolution 1973 in 2011, Resolution 2016 in 2011, and Resolution 2040 in 2012
 Côte d'Ivoire: Resolution 1975 in 2011
 Yemen: Resolution 2014 in 2011
 Mali: Resolution 2085 in 2012 and Resolution 2100 in 2013
 Sudan and South Sudan: Resolution 1996 in 2011 and Resolution 2121 in 2013

Secretary-General reports 
In January 2009, UN Secretary-General Ban Ki-moon released UN Secretariat's first comprehensive report on the R2P, called Implementing the Responsibility to Protect . His report led to a debate in the General Assembly in July 2009 and the first time since 2005 that the General Assembly had come together to discuss the R2P. Ninety-four member states spoke. Most supported the R2P principle, although some important concerns were voiced. They discussed how to implement the R2P in crisis situations around the world. The debate highlighted the need for regional organizations like the African Union to play a strong role in implementing R2P; the need for stronger early warning mechanisms in the UN; and the need to clarify the roles UN bodies would play in implementing R2P.

One outcome of the debate was the first resolution referencing R2P adopted by the General Assembly.  The Resolution (A/RES/63/308) showed that the international community had not forgotten about the concept of the R2P and it decided "to continue its consideration of the responsibility to protect".

In subsequent years, the Secretary-General would release a new report, followed by another debate in the General Assembly.

In 2010, the report was titled Early Warning, Assessment and the Responsibility to Protect . The informal interactive dialogue was held on 9 August 2010, with 49 member states, two regional organizations, and two civil society organizations speaking at the event. The discussion had a resoundingly positive tone, with virtually all of those that spoke stressing a need to prevent atrocities and agreeing that effective early warning is a necessary condition for effective prevention and early action. Objections were expressed by a small number of member states; namely Nicaragua, Iran, Pakistan, Sudan, and Venezuela.

In 2011, the report analyzed The Role of Regional and Subregional Arrangements in Implementing the Responsibility to Protect . At the debate on 12 July 2011, statements were made by 43 member states, three regional organizations, and four civil society representatives. The biggest challenge to R2P was considered cooperation with, and support between, the UN and regional bodies in times of crisis. Member states acknowledged the importance of resolving this challenge through the unique advantages regional organizations possess in preventing and reacting to mass atrocities.

In 2012, the focus was on Responsibility to Protect: Timely and Decisive Response . The debate followed on 5 September 2012 saw interventions address the third pillar of the R2P and the diversity of non-coercive and coercive measures available for a collective response to mass atrocity crimes.

In 2013, the Secretary-General focused on Responsibility to Protect: State responsibility and prevention . The debate following the report was held on 11 September 2013. A panel of UN, member state, and civil society experts delivered presentations, after which 68 member states, 1 regional organization, and 2 civil society organizations made statements.

Special Advisors on the Prevention of Genocide and the Responsibility to Protect 
In 2004, following the genocidal violence in Rwanda and the Balkans, UN Secretary-General Kofi Annan appointed Juan E. Méndez as Special Adviser to fill critical gaps in the international system that allowed those tragedies to go unchecked. In 2007, Secretary-General Ban Ki-moon appointed Francis M. Deng on a full-time basis at the level of Under-Secretary-General. Around the same time, he also appointed Edward Luck as the Special Adviser who focuses on the R2P, on a part-time basis at the level of Assistant Secretary-General.

The Special Adviser on the Responsibility to Protect leads the conceptual, political, institutional, and operational development of the R2P. The Special Adviser on the Prevention of Genocide acts as a catalyst to raise awareness of the causes and dynamics of genocide, to alert relevant actors where there is a risk of genocide, and to advocate and mobilize for appropriate action. The mandates of the two Special Advisers are distinct but complementary. The efforts of their Office include alerting relevant actors to the risk of genocide, war crimes, ethnic cleansing, and crimes against humanity; enhancing the capacity of the UN to prevent these crimes, including their incitement; and working with member states, regional and sub-regional arrangements, and civil society to develop more effective means of response when they do occur.

Both Special Advisers Deng and Luck ended their assignments with the Office in July 2012. On 17 July 2012, Secretary-General Ban Ki-moon appointed Adama Dieng of Senegal as his Special Adviser on the Prevention of Genocide. On 12 July 2013, Jennifer Welsh of Canada was appointed as the Special Advisor on the Responsibility to Protect.

In practice

Kenya, 2007-2008 
From December 2007 to January 2008, Kenya was swept by a wave of ethnic violence triggered by a disputed presidential election held on 27 December 2007. On 30 December 2007, Mwai Kibaki was declared the winner of the presidential elections and was sworn in as president a couple of hours later. The announcement of the results triggered widespread and systematic violence resulting in more than 1,000 deaths and the displacement of over 500,000 civilians. Clashes were characterized by the ethnically targeted killings of people aligned with the two major political parties, the Orange Democratic Movement (ODM) and the Party of National Unity (PNU).

External intervention was almost immediate. French Foreign and European Affairs Minister Bernard Kouchner made an appeal to the UN Security Council in January 2008 to react "in the name of the responsibility to protect" before Kenya plunged into a deadly ethnic conflict. On 31 December 2007, UN Secretary-General Ban Ki-moon issued a statement expressing concern for the ongoing violence and calling for the population to remain calm and for Kenyan security forces to show restraint. On 10 January 2008, former UN Secretary-General Kofi Annan was accepted by both the ODM and the PNU as the African Union Chief Mediator. Mediation efforts led to the signing of a power-sharing agreement on 28 February 2008. The agreement established Mwai Kibaki as President and Raila Odinga as Prime Minister, as well as the creation of three commissions: the Commission of Inquiry on Post-Election Violence (CIPEV); the Truth, Justice and Reconciliation Commission; and the Independent Review Commission on the General Elections. This rapid and coordinated reaction by the international community was praised by Human Rights Watch as "a model of diplomatic action under the 'Responsibility to Protect' principles".

Ivory Coast, 2011 
On 30 March 2011, in response to the escalating post-election violence against the population of Ivory Coast in late 2010 and early 2011, the Security Council unanimously adopted resolution 1975 condemning the gross human rights violations committed by supporters of both ex-President Laurent Gbagbo and President Alassane Ouattara. The resolution cited "the primary responsibility of each State to protect civilians", called for the immediate transfer of power to President Ouattara, the victor in the elections, and reaffirmed that the United Nations Operation in Ivory Coast (UNOCI) could use "all necessary means to protect life and property." On 4 April 2011, in an effort to protect the people of Ivory Coast from further atrocities, UNOCI began a military operation, and President Gbagbo's hold on power ended on 11 April when he was arrested by President Ouattara's forces. In November 2011, President Gbagbo was transferred to the International Criminal Court to face charges of crimes against humanity as an "indirect co-perpetrator" of murder, rape, persecution, and other inhumane acts. On 26 July 2012, the Council adopted resolution 2062 renewing the mandate of UNOCI until 31 July 2013. The mission officially ended on 30 June 2017.

Libya, 2011 

Libya was the first case where the Security Council authorized a military intervention citing the R2P. Following widespread and systematic attacks against the civilian population by the Libyan regime, and language used by Muammar Gaddafi that reminded the international community of the genocide in Rwanda, the Security Council unanimously adopted resolution 1970 on 26 February 2011, making explicit reference to the R2P. Deploring what it called "the gross and systematic violation of human rights" in strife-torn Libya, the Security Council demanded an end to the violence, "recalling the Libyan authorities' responsibility to protect its population", and imposed a series of international sanctions. The Council also decided to refer the situation to the International Criminal Court.

In resolution 1973, adopted on 17 March 2011, the Security Council demanded an immediate ceasefire in Libya, including an end to ongoing attacks against civilians, which it said might constitute "crimes against humanity". The Council authorized member states to take "all necessary measures" to protect civilians under threat of attack in the country, while excluding a foreign occupation force of any form on any part of Libyan territory. A few days later, acting on the resolution, NATO planes started striking at Gaddafi's forces. NATO subsequently came under scrutiny for its behavior during the air strikes; concerns included the fact that the intervention quickly moved to regime-change and that there were allegations regarding aerial bombardments that may have caused civilian casualties.

Central African Republic (CAR), 2013 
In December 2012, a loose rebel coalition named the Séléka initiated a military campaign to overthrow the government of the Central African Republic (CAR) and its then-president, Francois Bozizé. The Séléka, composed mostly of factions of armed groups in the northeast of the state, accused Bozizé's government of neglecting their region. They rapidly captured several strategic towns and were poised to take the capital city of Bangui. A hasty intervention by Chad and the Economic Community of Central African States (ECCAS) persuaded the Séléka to negotiate with Bozizé's government. The result, the Libreville Agreement of January 2013, installed a three-year power-sharing arrangement.

However, ECCAS failed to monitor the implementation of the Libreville Agreement and Bozizé did not undertake any of the reforms necessary under the transition agreement. Séléka resurged and took control of Bangui and fifteen of CAR's sixteen provinces on 24 March 2013. Séléka's leader, Michel Djotodia, proclaimed himself President, set up the National Transitional Council (NTC), and suspended CAR's constitution. A hurried ECCAS summit on 4 April 2013, which did not yet recognize Djotodia as President, called for the creation of a Transitional National Council (TNC), which would create a new constitution, conduct elections in eighteen months, and select an interim President. On 13 April, the TNC chose the sole candidate vying for interim president position, Michel Djotodia.

From December 2012 onward, Séléka forces, who are predominantly Muslim, committed grave human rights abuses against civilians throughout the country and especially targeted the majority Christian population. In response, Christian civilians formed "anti-balaka" ("anti-machete") militias, which have conducted vicious reprisals against Muslims. Extrajudicial killings of Muslim and Christian civilians have been carried out, including "door to door" searches by rival militias and mobs seeking potential victims.

The situation in CAR rapidly deteriorated after 5 December 2013, after an attack in Bangui by anti-balaka militias and loyalists of ousted President François Bozizé. The attack against former Séléka rebels sparked widespread violence throughout the capital as well as in Ouham province in the northwest. The violence marked a significant escalation of the conflict in CAR. Anti-balaka forces launched another attack against Muslim neighborhoods of Bangui on 20 December, spurring a cycle of renewed violence that led to at least 71 deaths by 24 December. A mass grave of at least 30 people who were reportedly executed and exhibited signs of torture was discovered on 25 December. The UN Office for the Coordination of Humanitarian Affairs (OCHA) estimates a further 40 civilians were killed on 25 December as violence continued between anti-balaka and ex-Séléka forces. Eight African Union (AU) peacekeepers were also killed between 25 and 26 December.

According to OCHA, by September 2013 there were almost 400,000 internally displaced people and about 65,000 new refugees in neighbouring countries. Humanitarian agencies alerted public opinion to the critical situation, stressing that 2.3 million CAR citizens (half the population) were in need of humanitarian assistance.

CAR and the R2P 
The crisis in the CAR was a case for the R2P, due to mass atrocity crimes being committed by both sides. During a Security Council briefing on 25 November, UN Deputy-Secretary-General Jan Eliasson said that the world faced "a profoundly important test of international solidarity and of our responsibility to protect" in CAR. The Security Council passed Resolution 2127 on 5 December, emphasizing that the NTC has the primary responsibility to protect the civilian population in CAR. The resolution granted a Chapter VII mandate to AU and French forces to protect civilians and restore security, imposed an arms embargo, and established a UN Commission of Inquiry.

In the beginning, the international response to the coup was purely diplomatic: members of the International Contact Group insisted that Michel Djotodia respect the principles set out in the Libreville agreement. The African Union was the first to react when it announced a new African-led International Support Mission for CAR (MISCA) in July 2013. However, MISCA was ineffective in reversing the deteriorating security situation. Although its mandate was well-defined, there was general agreement that it lacked the resources to fulfill its mission. The UN General Assembly put CAR on the international agenda in September. Resolution 2121, adopted on 10 October 2013 and sponsored by France, strengthened and broadened the mandate of the UN Integrated Peacebuilding Office in the Central African Republic (BINUCA). Aware that MISCA alone would be unable to adequately tackle the growing insecurity, France changed its initial position from disengagement to military contribution, as announced by François Hollande on 20 November 2013, who said that French forces would be reinforced by almost 1,000 troops for a six-month period. France began to deploy troops in CAR after receiving authorization from the Security Council on 5 December 2013 with Resolution 2127, which authorizes MISCA and French forces to take "all necessary measures" to protect civilians and restore security in CAR. French soldiers immediately began to patrol in Bangui.

On 7 February 2014, it was reported that the International Criminal Court's chief prosecutor Fatou Bensouda said that she had "opened a preliminary investigation into possible war crimes in the Central African Republic".

Syria 
Over the last nine years, Syria has been in constant conflict. The war in Syria has directly killed 500,000 people, generated 5 million refugees, and internally displaced 7 million people. To help stop these atrocities the International Syria Support Group (ISSG), the UN, European Union, the League of Arab States, and other countries had agreed to meet to discuss the situation at stake. The conclusion was made that the full implementation of UN Security Council Resolution 2254, which increased the delivery of humanitarian aid, as well as a nationwide cessation of hostilities, was required in order to help those in need. The Commission on Inquiry, mandated by the Human Rights Council, has found the Syrian government while working with allied militias, has committed large-scale massacres, perpetrated war crimes and gross violations of international humanitarian law as a matter of state policy. The Commission of Inquiry's third report had stated that the government had committed crimes against humanity through extermination, murder, rape and other forms of sexual violence, torture, imprisonment, enforced disappearance, and other inhuman acts. Due to this statement, the UN Human Rights Council has adopted at least 16 different resolutions with regard to the atrocities taking place in Syria.  Despite all efforts and resolutions adopted to help uphold R2P, humanitarian aid has had limited success in reaching the affected populations.

Burundi 
The country of Burundi is at grave risk for a possible civil war, if violence is not stopped. The civilians of Burundi face the serious and eminent risk of mass atrocities due to the ongoing political violence that threatens the stability of Burundi.  The citizens of Burundi are being harmed through mass atrocity crimes due to targeted killings, widespread violations and abuses of human rights. Violence had increased after President Pierre Nkurnziza had announced he was seeking a third term in the country’s elections, and instructing his citizens to disarm or face action by Burundian Security forces and be labeled enemies of the nation. The Office of the High Commissioner for Human Rights reports cases of sexual violence by security forces, hate speech, and incitement to violence by some government officials. Responses by the international community include a Security Council-mandated police force with the goal of monitoring the situation. This police force has been rejected by Burundi.

Yemen Crisis
With the current armed conflict in Yemen, many civilians are facing mass atrocity crimes. These crimes are a result of the violence between pro-government forces and regional military as they fight against the Houthi rebels. The Houthi rebels and pro-Saleh personnel currently control a majority of Yemen, including the country's capital, Sana’a. In addition to the violence between these groups the nation has also been barraged by Saudi-led airstrikes for years. Between 26 March 2015 and 8 November 2018, the conflict has resulted in over 6,872 civilian deaths, the majority of these from Saudi-led airstrikes. The violence has also led to 2.4 million Yemeni civilians being forcibly displaced leaving 82 percent of the population, equivalent to 21.2 million people, in need of humanitarian assistance. The ongoing violence in Yemen has allowed third-party armed groups, such as Al-Qaeda, to take advantage of the instability in the nation.

Russian invasion of Ukraine, 2022

Russia’s February 24, 2022 invasion of Ukraine has already had an extreme impact on bordering countries. Hundreds of thousands of refugees have been flooding Romania, Poland, and other countries in search of safety. While Ukraine is not a part of NATO, and thus not entitled to the security protections offered by the thirty member nations, NATO Member States have considered the risk to sovereignty that Russia’s invasion of Ukraine poses. NATO allies are prepared to defend NATO territory if Russia were to attempt to expand its incursion on the territory of NATO Member States.

Praise 
Anne-Marie Slaughter from Princeton University has called R2P "the most important shift in our conception of sovereignty since the Treaty of Westphalia in 1648."

Louise Arbour from the International Crisis Group said that "The responsibility to protect is the most important and imaginative doctrine to emerge on the international scene for decades."

Francis Deng, former UN Special Advisor on the Prevention of Genocide, stated that "R2P is one of the most powerful and promising innovations on the international scene."

Political scientist Alex Bellamy argues (i) that there is evidence of behavioral change in the way international society responds to mass killing and (ii) that R2P considerations have influenced behavior. On the first point, Bellamy argues that criticism of R2P as insufficient change is driven by a small subset of cases (Darfur, Libya and Syria) that are not indicative of strong trends. On the second point, Bellamy finds that R2P language is used in UNSC deliberations and in the rhetoric of world leaders.

International relations professor Amitai Etzioni notes R2P challenges the Westphalian norm that state sovereignty is “absolute.” R2P establishes “conditional” state sovereignty contingent upon fulfilling certain domestic and international obligations. Etzioni considers the R2P norm of conditional sovereignty a communitarian approach as it recognizes states have the right to self-determination and self-governance, but they also have a responsibility to the international community to protect the environment, promote peace, and not harm their state’s inhabitants.

Criticism 
R2P and certain implementations of it have come under criticism by some states and individuals.

National sovereignty 
One of the main concerns surrounding R2P is that it infringes upon national sovereignty. This concern is rebutted by the Secretary General Ban Ki-moon in the report Implementing the Responsibility to Protect. According to the first pillar of R2P, the state has the responsibility to protect its populations from mass atrocities and ethnic cleansing, and according to the second pillar the international community has the responsibility to help states fulfill their responsibility. Advocates of R2P claim that the only occasions where the international community will intervene in a state without its consent is when the state is either allowing mass atrocities to occur, or is committing them, in which case the state is no longer upholding its responsibilities as a sovereign. In this sense, R2P can be understood as reinforcing sovereignty. In 2004, the High-level Panel on Threats, Challenges and Change, set up by Secretary-General Kofi Annan, endorsed the emerging norm of R2P, stating that there is a collective international responsibility "...exercisable by the Security Council authorizing military intervention as a last resort, in the event of genocide and other large-scale killing, ethnic cleansing, and serious violations of humanitarian law which sovereign governments have proved powerless or unwilling to prevent."

Libya, 2011 
On 19 March 2011, the Security Council approved Resolution 1973, which reiterated the responsibility of the Libyan authorities to protect the Libyan population. The UNSC resolution reaffirmed "that parties to armed conflicts bear the primary responsibility to take all feasible steps to ensure the protection of civilians." It demanded "an immediate ceasefire in Libya, including an end to the current attacks against civilians, which it said might constitute 'crimes against humanity'.... It imposed a ban on all flights in the country's airspace, a no-fly zone, and tightened sanctions on the Gadaffi government and its supporters." The resolution passed, with 10 in favor, 0 against, and 5 abstentions. Two of the five abstentions were China and Russia, both of which are permanent members of the Security Council.

India's UN Ambassador Hardeep Singh Puri stated that "the Libyan case has already given R2P a bad name" and that "the only aspect of the resolution of interest to them (international community) was use of all necessary means to bomb the hell out of Libya". Puri also alleged that civilians had been supplied with arms and that the no-fly zone had been implemented only selectively.

Critics, such as Russia and China, said that the intervening forces led by NATO in Libya had over-stepped their mandate by taking actions that ultimately led to the overthrow of Gaddafi. While the Security Council authorised an R2P-based intervention to protect against government reprisals in rebel-held Benghazi, the UN resolution was used to provide air support for the rebellion against Gaddafi, without which he would not have been overthrown. Critics said the actions of the West in Libya created global skepticism about proposals put to the UN by the West to intervene in Syria the same year, putting the future of R2P in question.

Syria, 2011: Russian and Chinese repudiation of abuse of R2P 
Several attempts were made by the U.S. government in the course of 2011 to 2013 to pass Security Council resolutions invoking R2P to justify military intervention in the Syrian Civil War. These were vetoed by Russia and China. The Russian and Chinese governments both issued statements to the effect that, in their opinion, R2P had been abused by the U.S. as a pretext for "regime change", more particularly in the case of Libya, and that as far as they were concerned they would be extremely suspicious of any future Security Council resolutions invoking R2P, based on past experience. According to the UN's own 4 October 2011 coverage of the meeting of the Security Council:

[Russia's UN Ambassador Vitaly Churkin] was alarmed that compliance with Security Council resolutions in Libya had been considered a model for future actions by the North Atlantic Treaty Organization (NATO). It was important to see how that model had been implemented. The demand for a ceasefire had turned into a civil war, the humanitarian, social and military consequences of which had spilled beyond Libya. The arms embargo had turned into a naval blockade on west Libya. Such models should be excluded from global practice.

[…] [China's UN Ambassador Li Baodong] hoped that the [Syrian] Government would follow through on reform and a process of dialogue. The Council should encourage those objectives while respecting Syria's sovereignty's [sic] and territorial integrity. Any action it took should contribute to peace and stability and comply with the United Nations Charter principles of non-interference in internal affairs.

Military intervention 
The question of military intervention under the third pillar of R2P remains controversial. Several states have argued that R2P should not allow the international community to intervene militarily on states, because to do so is an infringement upon sovereignty.  Others argue that this is a necessary facet of R2P, and is necessary as a last resort to stop mass atrocities.  A related argument surrounds the question as to whether more specific criteria should be developed to determine when the Security Council should authorize military intervention.

Structural Problems 
Political scientist Roland Paris, a proponent of R2P, argues that several problems regarding usefulness and legitimacy inherent to R2P make it vulnerable to criticism: "the more R2P is employed as a basis for military action, the more likely it is to be discredited, but paradoxically, the same will hold true if R2P’s coercive tools go unused." Paris lists the following problems as inherent to R2P, making it difficult for proponents of R2P to defend R2P and emboldening critics:
 The mixed-motives problem – The legitimacy of R2P rests upon its altruistic aim. However, states will often be wary to engage in humanitarian intervention unless the intervention is partly rooted in self-interest. The appearance that the intervention is not strictly altruistic consequently leads some to question its legitimacy.
 The counterfactual problem – When R2P is successful, there will not be any clear-cut evidence of its success: a mass atrocity that did not occur but would have occurred without intervention. Defenders of R2P consequently have to rely on counterfactual arguments.
 The conspicuous harm problem – While the benefits of the intervention will not be clearly visible, the destructiveness and costs of the intervention will be visible. This makes it more difficult for proponents of the intervention to defend the intervention. The destruction caused by the intervention also makes some question the legitimacy of the intervention due to the stated purpose of preventing harm.
 The end-state problem – Humanitarian intervention is prone to expand the mission beyond simply averting mass atrocities. When successful at averting mass atrocities, the intervenors will often be forced to take upon themselves more expansive mandates to ensure that threatened populations will be safe after the intervenors leave.
 The inconsistency problem – Due to the aforementioned problems, in addition to the belief that a particular military action is likely to cause more harm than good, states may fail to act in situations where mass atrocities loom. The failure to intervene in any and all situations where there is a risk of mass atrocities lead to charges of inconsistency.

See also 
Never again

References

Bibliography 
 
 Ban, Ki-moon, The Role of Regional and Sub-Regional Arrangements in Implementing the Responsibility to Protect, A/65/877–S/2011/39, 28 June 2011.
 
 
 
 
 
 Bellamy, Alex J. 2009. Responsibility to Protect: The Global Effort to End Mass Atrocities, Cambridge: Polity.
 
 
 Bellamy, Alex J. 2011. Global politics and the responsibility to protect: from words to deeds. Abingdon: Routledge.
 
 
 Briggs, E. Donald, Walter C. Soderlund and Abdel Salam Sidahmed. 2010. The responsibility to protect in Darfur: the Role of Mass Media. Lanham: Lexington Books.
 Camp, Charles H., Gore, Kiran Nasir, Chu, Lilia, "Nation States Must Comply With Their Responsibility to Protect Ukraine Against the Russian Federation’s Ongoing War Crimes," The World Financial Review (March 1, 2022), https://worldfinancialreview.com/nation-states-must-comply-with-their-responsibility-to-protect-ukraine-against-the-russian-federations-ongoing-war-crimes/
 Chandler, David. 2005. ‘The Responsibility to Protect: Imposing the Liberal Peace’. In Peace Operations and Global Order, eds Alex J. Bellamy and Paul D. Williams. London: Routledge.
 
 Contessi, Nicola P. "Multilateralism, intervention and norm contestation: China’s stance on Darfur in the UN security council." Security Dialogue 41, 3 (2010): 323–344.
 
 Davies, Sara, Alex J. Bellamy and Luke Glanville. 2011. The Responsibility to Protect and International Law. Martinus Nijhoff Publishers.
 Deng, Francis, Rothchild, Donald, et al. "Sovereignty as Responsibility Conflict Management in Africa". (Washington DC: Brookings Institution Press, September 1996). c. 290pp.
 
 
 Evans, Gareth. 2004. ‘The Responsibility to Protect: Rethinking Humanitarian Intervention’. Proceedings of the Annual Meeting, reprinted in American Society of International Law 98: 78-89.
 Evans, G., The Responsibility to Protect: End Mass Atrocity Crimes Once and for All, Washington D.C.: Brookings Institution, 2008
 Evans, Gareth. The Responsibility to Protect: Ending Mass Atrocity Crimes Once and For All. (Washington DC: Brookings Institution Press, September 2008)
 
 
 Glanville, Luke. 2021. Sharing Responsibility: The History and Future of Protection from Atrocities. Princeton University Press.
 Gallagher, Adrian. 'A Clash of Responsibilities: Engaging with Realist Critiques of the R2P', Global Responsibility to Protect, vol. 4, no. 3, 2012, 334–357.
 Hehir, Aidan. 2010. "The Responsibility to Protect: Sound and Fury Signifying Nothing?" International Relations.
Hilpold, Peter (ed.), Responsibility to Protect (R2P). Brill/Martinus Nijhoff. 2015.

 Luck, Edward C., ‘The United Nations and the Responsibility to Protect’, Stanley Foundation Policy Analysis Brief, August 2008
 
 Orford, Anne. 2011. International Authority and Responsibility to Protect. Cambridge University Press.
 Pattison, James. 2010. Humanitarian Intervention and the Responsibility To Protect. Oxford: Oxford University Press.
 Ramesh Thakur and William Malley. Theorising the Responsibility to Protect. Cambridge University Press, 2015. .
 
 
 
 Thakur, Ramesh Chandra. 2011. The Responsibility to Protect: Norms, Laws, and the Use of Force in International Politics. Routledge.
 Thakur, Ramesh. 2016. "Review article: The Responsibility to Protect at 15." International Affairs.  
 Voinov Kohler, Juliette and Richard H. Cooper. 2008. The Responsibility to Protect: the Global Moral Compact for the 21st Century. Palgrave Macmillan.
 Weiss, Thomas and Don Hubert. 2001. The Responsibility to Protect: Research, Bibliography, Background. Ottawa: ICISS.

External links 
 IPI's Edward C. Luck briefs UN General Assembly on R2P, 9 August 2010
 Whose Responsibility to Protect?, debate between four R2P practitioners, October 2009.
 Global Centre for the Responsibility to Protect
 Asia-Pacific Centre for R2P

 
International relations theory
2005 in international relations
Genocide prevention